Events from the year 1781 in France

Incumbents
 Monarch – Louis XVI

Events

6 January – Battle of Jersey
May – Invasion of Tobago
12 December – Battle of Ushant

Science

Astronomy 
Messier 87, a supergiant elliptical galaxy, was discovered by French astronomer Charles Messier.

Births
27 March – Charles Joseph Minard, engineer (died 1870)
1 May – François-Désiré Breton, naval officer

Deaths

18 March – Anne-Robert-Jacques Turgot, Baron de Laune, statesman (born 1727)
16 August – Charles-François de Broglie, marquis de Ruffec, soldier and diplomat (born 1719)

Full date missing 
Christophe de Beaumont, archbishop (born 1703)

References

1780s in France